Luther Burbank Middle School can refer to:
Luther Burbank Middle School (Burbank)
Luther Burbank Middle School (Los Angeles)
Luther Burbank Middle School (Massachusetts)

See also
Burbank Elementary School (disambiguation)
Burbank High School (disambiguation)